John Craig "Ian" Allen (27 January 1932 – 11 November 2018) was a Scottish footballer who played in the Football League for Queens Park Rangers and Bournemouth & Boscombe Athletic.

References

External links
 

Footballers from Renfrewshire
English Football League players
1932 births
2018 deaths
Beith F.C. players
Queens Park Rangers F.C. players
AFC Bournemouth players
Salisbury City F.C. players
Association football wingers
People from Johnstone
Scottish footballers